Aerenea impetiginosa is a species of beetle in the family Cerambycidae. It was described by Thomson in 1868. It is known from Guatemala, Honduras, Colombia, Costa Rica, Mexico, Nicaragua, Panama, Peru, and Venezuela.

References

Compsosomatini
Beetles described in 1868